Sandra Edith Torres Álvarez (born December 21, 1974, in La Falda, Córdoba) is a marathon runner from Argentina. She is a four-time winner of the Buenos Aires Marathon in her native country (1999, 2001 and 2006) and represented Argentina in the women's marathon at the 2004 Summer Olympics in Athens, Greece.

Achievements
All results regarding marathon, unless stated otherwise

References
 Profile
 sports-reference

1974 births
Living people
Argentine female marathon runners
Athletes (track and field) at the 2004 Summer Olympics
Olympic athletes of Argentina
Sportspeople from Córdoba Province, Argentina
21st-century Argentine women